Lycomormium is a genus of orchids, with 5 currently recognized  species found in Colombia, Ecuador and Peru.

Lycomormium ecuadorense H.R.Sweet - Ecuador
Lycomormium elatum C.Schweinf. - Peru
Lycomormium fiskei H.R.Sweet - Ecuador, Peru
Lycomormium schmidtii A.Fernández - Colombia
Lycomormium squalidum (Poepp. & Endl.) Rchb.f. - Ecuador, Peru, Colombia

References

 (1852) Botanische Zeitung (Berlin) 10: 833.
  (2009) Epidendroideae (Part two). Genera Orchidacearum 5: 43 ff. Oxford University Press.

External links

Coeliopsidinae genera
Orchids of South America
Coeliopsidinae